Bajiao Subdistrict is a subdistrict on the southeastern part of Shijingshan District , Beijing, China. It borders Pingguoyuan Subdistrict to its north, Sijiqing, Tiancunlu and Laoshan Subdistricts to its east, Lugu Subdistrict to its south, and Gucheng Subdistrict to its west. As of 2020, its population was 110,929.

The subdistrict was established in 1983, and got its name Bajiao from a village that predated the subdistrict.

Administrative Division 
As of 2021, Bajiao Subdistrict contains a  total of 23 communities:

See also 
 List of township-level divisions of Beijing

References 

Shijingshan District
Subdistricts of Beijing